Kerrytown is part of the Old Fourth Ward historic district in Ann Arbor, Michigan, USA. It is approximately bound by Main Street to the west, Depot Street to the north, Division Street to the east, and Huron Street to the south. It is known for its brick streets and sidewalks, diverse array of shops and vibrant culture. It includes several iconic establishments, including the Ann Arbor Farmers Market, the Kerrytown Concert House, Zingerman's Deli, the Ann Arbor Hands-On Museum, and Community High School. Kerrytown is also known for its LGBT population and progressive politics.

History
Kerrytown was part of the original Village of Annarbour, incorporated in 1833, and was named after County Kerry in Ireland.

The Kerrytown District Association organizes events in the neighborhood. In July 2017, the Association began First Fridays, an event occurring on the first Friday of every month to promote local business and tourism. Kerrytown also hosts an annual Christmas tree lighting.

Ann Arbor Pride, the pride parade of Ann Arbor, has been celebrated annually in Kerrytown since 1994. The neighborhood was the site of Aut Bar, the only gay bar in Ann Arbor, established in 1995 and closed in 2020.

Gallery

References

External links
 Kerrytown District Association
 Kerrytown Market & Shops
 

Historic districts in Michigan
Culture of Ann Arbor, Michigan